Simon and Monika Newbound are long distance motorcyclists from the United Kingdom.

On 25 October 2004, the Newbounds completed a  full circumnavigation of the Earth. Their route went eastward from Sligo, Ireland to St. John's, Newfoundland, through 71 countries including Norway, Russia, Kazakhstan, Mongolia, Japan, Canada, and the United States. They rode their BMW F650GS and R1150GS bikes above the Arctic Circle three times on three different continents. They both rode across every state in the United States and every province in Canada, crossing North America six times. Monika and Simon rode their bikes through the Gobi, Sahara, Mojavi and Kavir deserts.

Prior to their first major journey, neither had any experience of motorcycle mechanics, and Monika had never undertaken a long distance trip before. Their World Records were achieved without any backup teams or support vehicles. During their travels around the world they have been welcomed and hosted by many kind, generous and famous people.

Today (written April 2017) Simon and Monika Newbound await confirmation from Guinness World Records for their second world record when they both rode more than 51000 miles continuously in the country of Iran.

References 

Motorcycling writers
Long-distance motorcycle riders
English sportswriters
Living people
Year of birth missing (living people)